Yondaru Kimu, also known as Kim Young Dal, (1948-2000) was a Japanese-Korean historian who focused on Sōshi-kaimei. He was also a civil rights activist focused on North Koreans fleeing North Korea.

Early life and education
Yondaru Kimu was born on October 7, 1948, in Kasugai, Aichi, Japan. His parents were Korean. In 1970, he gained his Japanese citizenship. He married Sadae Yamaki in 1981. Kimu graduated from Kobe University in 1980.

Career

After graduating college, Kimu was an adjunct professor at Kansai University. He focused on Sōshi-kaimei and modern Korean history.

He was active in various Zainichi groups. He was chair of Rescue the North Korean People-Urgent Action Network (RENK), a civil rights group focused on North Korean human rights.

Later life and legacy

On April 24, 2000, Kimu was stabbed to death in his apartment in Amagasaki, Hyogo, Japan. His colleague, Suzanne Scholte, and colleagues at RENK speculate Kimu was murdered by North Korea for his human rights work.

Kimu's collection of Zainichi research is in the collection of the University of Southern California's East Asian Library.

References

1948 births
2000 deaths
Historians of Japan
Historians of Korea
20th-century Japanese historians
People from Kasugai, Aichi
Korean emigrants to Japan
Kobe University alumni
Academic staff of Kansai University
People from Amagasaki
Unsolved murders in Japan
Assassinated Japanese people
Assassinated activists
Deaths by stabbing in Japan